The 2013–14 Serie A (known as the Serie A TIM for sponsorship reasons) was the 112th season of top-tier Italian football, the 82nd in a round-robin tournament, and the 4th since its organization under a league committee separate from Serie B. The season began on 24 August 2013 and concluded on 18 May 2014. As in previous years, Nike provided the official ball for all matches with a new Nike Incyte model used throughout the season. Juventus were the defending champions, and successfully defended their title to win a third Serie A title in a row with a record-breaking 102 points.

A total of 20 teams competed in the league: 17 sides from the 2012–13 season and three promoted from the 2012–13 Serie B campaign. Palermo, Pescara and Siena were each demoted from the top flight. They were replaced by Serie B champion Sassuolo, runner-up Hellas Verona and play-off winner Livorno. Hellas Verona returned to Serie A after an 11-year absence, Livorno after four seasons and this season marked Sassuolo's Serie A debut.

For the first time in the competition's history, there were five derbies among teams from the same city: Milan (Internazionale and Milan), Turin (Juventus and Torino), Rome (Lazio and Roma), Genoa (Genoa and Sampdoria), and Verona (Chievo and Hellas Verona).

Teams

Number of teams by region

Stadiums and locations

1Cagliari is going to play at Stadio Nereo Rocco in Trieste while Stadio Sant'Elia is under renovation.
2Some matches may be played at Stadio Nereo Rocco in Trieste if Stadio Friuli's renovation is not finished.

Personnel and sponsorship

Managerial changes

 Assistant coach Diego López was promoted to head coaching role after he was admitted to the yearly UEFA Pro Licence course on 16 July 2013, with former head coach Ivo Pulga being moved to an assistant role, thus exchanging roles with respect to the previous season.

League table

Results

Season statistics

Top goalscorers

Source:

Scoring
First goal of the season: Poli (Milan) in Hellas Verona–Milan 2–1, 15 minutes (24 August 2013)
Fastest goal of the season: Sansone (Sampdoria) in Sassuolo–Sampdoria 1–2, 18 seconds (26 March 2014)

Discipline
First yellow card of the season: Jorginho (Hellas Verona) in Hellas Verona–Milan 2–1, 20 minutes (24 August 2013)
First red card of the season: Castellini (Sampdoria) in Sampdoria–Juventus 0–1, 90 minutes (24 August 2013)

Hat-tricks

Average attendance

Source:http://www.european-football-statistics.co.uk/attn.htm

References

External links
 

Serie A seasons
Italy
1